Andrew Jay Diamond (born 1 November 1967) is an American academic and professor of United States history at Sorbonne University, where he directs the research center Histoire et dynamique des espaces anglophones.

Early life and education 
Diamond was born in Boston in 1967 and raised in Needham, Massachusetts. He attended Tufts University (1986-1990), where he majored in history and English. He obtained his PhD in history from the University of Michigan in Ann Arbor in 2004 with a doctoral dissertation entitled "Hoodlums, Rebels, and Vice lords: Street Gangs, Youth Subcultures, and Race in Chicago, 1919-1968." His doctoral research earned him a fellowship from the Harry Frank Guggenheim Foundation.

Career 
Diamond began his academic career in France in 2002 as a lecturer in American civilization at the Université de Picardie – Jules Verne and then moved on to the Université de Lille 3 in 2005, where he worked as an Assistant Professor until 2010. Between 2010 and 2012, Diamond was a full research fellow at the Centre d'Etudes et de Recherches Internationales (CERI) at Sciences Po - Paris, where he also taught a number of classes between 2007 and 2012. In 2012, he obtained his current position at the Sorbonne.

Diamond has been a member of the editorial boards of the Revue française d'études américaines and The Sixties: A Journal of History, Politics and Culture, and served on the board of directors of the Urban History Association and the Fulbright Commission in France. He has been a featured speaker for the African Regional Services of the United States Department of State, the United States Embassy in Paris, and the Consulate General of France in Chicago. He worked with the Institut Français of the French Ministry of Foreign Affairs as curator of "City/Cité: A Transatlantic Exchange," a program of international conferences that brings together researchers, artists, policymakers, and activists from the United States and France to engage in a dialogue about the current state of urban democracy and of the circumstances arrayed against the realization of democratic ideals. He has written extensively and appeared regularly in both the French and American mainstream media on issues of race and inequality in France and the United States.

Works 
He is the author or co-author of a number of articles and books on the history of politics, race and political culture. His first monograph, Mean Streets: Chicago Youths and the Everyday Struggle for Empowerment in the Multiracial City, 1908-1969, provides a comprehensive history of Chicago's youth subcultures and street gangs and their connection to racial identity formation and grassroots racial politics. The book was reviewed favorably in numerous scholarly journals and by the Chicago press. Historian Perry Duis praised it as "an enormously important book for historians in several fields," and the Chicago Reader called it "a fascinating and revealing narrative." His most recent monograph, Chicago on the Make: Power and Inequality in a Modern City explores the "link between race and neoliberalization at Chicago's grassroots over the 20th century". The book was awarded the Jon Gjerde Prize for the best book in Midwestern history in 2017 and the Illinois State Historical Society's Award of Superior Achievement, and was featured in the New York Times. Chicago on the Make has been lauded by a number of commentators for its hard-hitting analysis of the Chicago success story and the politicians who have rallied around it. Longtime Chicago anti-racist punk band Race Traitor referred to it as a "full take down of the neoliberal politics of Chicago," and the Chicago Review asserted that "no one seems to come out unscathed from Diamond’ s historical overview, and finishing the book, regardless of political orientation or preference, leaves one with the feeling of having just unfurled a scroll coated in an uncomfortable film of grease."

Major publications 
Diamond, Andrew J. and Thomas J. Sugrue, eds., Neoliberal Cities: The Remaking of Postwar Urban America (New York: New York University Press, 2020)

Diamond, Andrew J., Chicago on the Make: Power and Inequality in a Modern City (Oakland: University of California Press, 2017)

Diamond, Andrew and Pap Ndiaye, Histoire de Chicago (Paris: Fayard, 2013)

Diamond, Andrew, J., Mean Streets: Chicago Youths and the Everyday Struggle for Empowerment in the Multiracial City, 1908-1969 (Berkeley and Los Angeles: University of California Press, 2009)

References 

Acclaimed historian Andrew J. Diamond returns to CPL to discuss his new book, Chicago on the Make.

Chauvin, S. 2014. Chicago et l'exception urbaine américaine. A propos des Andrew Diamond, Pap Ndiaye, Histoire de Chicago, Fayard in La vie des idées

Duis, P.R. 2012. Mean Streets: Chicago Youths and the Everyday Struggle for Empowerment in the Multiracial City, 1908–1969.

Hinderer, M. 2010. Mean Streets: Chicago Youths and the Everyday Struggle for Empowerment in the Multiracial City, 1908–1969. By Andrew J. Diamond.(Berkeley: University of California Press, 2009. xviii, 396 pp.  ).

Pacyga, D. 2011. 'Review of Diamond, Andrew J., Mean Streets: Chicago Youths and the Everyday Struggle for Empowerment in the Multiracial City, 1908-1969.'  H-Urban, H-Net Reviews.

Wesley, J.M. 2010. "Andrew J. Diamond, Mean Streets: Chicago Youths and the Everyday Struggle for Empowerment in the Multiracial City, 1908–1969," The Journal of African American History 95(3-4), pp. 451–453.

Wieviorka, O. 2013. Critique: Chicaghetto.  Libération

Young Jr, A.A., 2010. Mean Streets: Chicago Youths and the Everyday Struggle for Empowerment in the Multiracial City, 1908-1969.

21st-century American historians
American male non-fiction writers
Academic staff of Paris-Sorbonne University
1967 births
Living people
American expatriate academics
American expatriates in France
Writers from Boston
Tufts University School of Arts and Sciences alumni
University of Michigan alumni
Historians from Massachusetts
People from Needham, Massachusetts
21st-century American male writers